La India Airport  is an airstrip serving the Yata River village of La India in the Beni Department of Bolivia.

See also

Transport in Bolivia
List of airports in Bolivia

References

External links 
OpenStreetMap - La India Airport
OurAirports - La India Airport
Fallingrain - La India Airport

Airports in Beni Department